Robert J. Kenny (October 19, 1968 – July 21, 2010) was an American professional ice hockey player who played in various minor Leagues in North America, as well as in Great Britain.

Career
Kenny played junior hockey with the Waterloo Black Hawks of the United States Hockey League. During his time in the USHL he was named to the South Division's All Star team for the 1988-89 season. Following two years in the USHL, he walked on to the Northeastern Huskies, where he played for three years. In his final season with the Huskies he was named Assistant Captain and was named the team's Most Valuable Player.

Kenny began his professional career in 1992 with the Binghamton Rangers of the AHL, a team he played for three seasons. In 1995 he joined the Long Beach Ice Dogs in the IHL, again for three seasons. Following his stint in Long Beach, Kenny played for two teams during the 1998-99 season; the Miami Matadors of the ECHL and the Orlando Solar Bears of the IHL. Kenny then moved overseas and played for the London Knights in the BISL, where he was named team Captain and lead the team in scoring with 40 points in 39 games. The Knights would go on to win the playoffs, beating the Newcastle Riverkings 7-3 in the final to be crowned British Champions. Kenny was named as an BISL All-Star at the culmination of the season.

Career Statistics

Regular Season and Playoffs

Awards
 BISL First Team All Star (1999-00)

Death
Kenny died on July 21, 2010 as a result of a traffic collision. He is survived by his wife Janelle, and their three children: Ryan, Sean and Ella.

References

External Links

1968 births
2010 deaths
American men's ice hockey right wingers
Binghamton Rangers players
Ice hockey players from New York (state)
London Knights (UK) players
Los Angeles Ice Dogs players
Long Beach Ice Dogs (IHL) players
Miami Matadors players
Northeastern Huskies men's ice hockey players
Orlando Solar Bears (IHL) players
Sportspeople from the Bronx
Waterloo Black Hawks players